The George Washington Hollida House is a brick house built c. 1842 near the village of Scrabble, West Virginia, United States. The Hollida (pronounced "Holiday") House is an example of an I-house with a five-bay front and a four-bay ell extending to the rear with Greek Revival detailing. The property includes several outbuildings and a bank barn. The Hollida house is included in the larger Scrabble Historic District, which encompasses the entire village.

References

Houses on the National Register of Historic Places in West Virginia
Houses in Berkeley County, West Virginia
Houses completed in 1842
Greek Revival houses in West Virginia
National Register of Historic Places in Berkeley County, West Virginia
Individually listed contributing properties to historic districts on the National Register in West Virginia